Lawrence Dean "Larry" Young (born February 10, 1943) is an American racewalker. He had his best results in the 50 km distance, winning bronze medals at the 1968 and 1972 Olympics and gold medals at the 1967 and 1971 Pan American Games. Young is the only American to ever win a medal in long distance racewalking.

Young graduated from Columbia College (Missouri), where he attended on the only racewalking scholarship given in the United States.

Young is an accomplished sculptor who has placed over 50 monumental outdoor sculptures nationally and abroad. Most of his work has been in bronze, but he also works with stainless steel, marble, and other materials. He owns and operates a full-scale,  foundry where he personally creates and produces most of his work.  He also has works on display with the Art of the Olympians.

References

1943 births
Living people
Sportspeople from Independence, Missouri
Track and field athletes from Missouri
American male racewalkers
Olympic bronze medalists for the United States in track and field
Athletes (track and field) at the 1967 Pan American Games
Athletes (track and field) at the 1968 Summer Olympics
Athletes (track and field) at the 1971 Pan American Games
Athletes (track and field) at the 1972 Summer Olympics
Athletes (track and field) at the 1975 Pan American Games
Columbia College (Missouri) alumni
Medalists at the 1972 Summer Olympics
Medalists at the 1968 Summer Olympics
Pan American Games gold medalists for the United States
Pan American Games medalists in athletics (track and field)
Medalists at the 1967 Pan American Games
Medalists at the 1971 Pan American Games
Medalists at the 1975 Pan American Games